The 2015 UCI Road World Championships took place in Richmond, Virginia, United States from September 19–27, 2015. It was the 88th Road World Championships. Peter Sagan won the men's road race and Lizzie Armitstead won the women's road race.

Bidding and selection of Richmond
By UCI's deadline expired on February 20, 2011, three nations had announced their intention to bid for this event:

Richmond, Virginia, 
 Richmond announced its bid to host these championships at an official press conference on December 21, 2010.
 
 During the 2011 Tour of Oman race organiser Eddy Merckx confirmed that the Arabian country would bid to host the 2015 world championships. He offered his support, and media reports indicated he could have a key role in the organisation of the championships.
Quebec City, Quebec, 
 Quebec City bid for these championships after being encouraged by Pat McQuaid, president of the UCI. Quebec City was the only Canadian city that entered a bid by Cycling Canada's deadline of November 7, 2010. In 2011 Quebec City withdrew, citing the high cost of hosting the event ($20 million).

On September 21, 2011, Richmond was selected as the host for the championships.

Planners anticipated over 500,000 visitors over the 10-day event According to the organizers the championships are believed to generate a significant economic impact in the Greater Richmond region. Staging the event can generate a $21.3 million cumulative economic impact in the region from 2012 to 2015. Visitor spending can bring a $129.2 million economic impact to the region in 2015. The Richmond 2015 visitor spending is estimated to result in $3.8 million in tax revenue for local governments in the Greater Richmond region in 2015. For Virginia, the economic impact of Richmond 2015 is estimated to be $158.1 million, from both event staging and visitor spending. Richmond 2015 is estimated to also generate $5.0 million in state tax revenue.

Qualification

Main qualification was based on performances on the UCI events during 2015. Results from January to the middle of August counted towards the qualification criteria, with the rankings being determined upon the release of the numerous tour rankings on August 15, 2015.

Olympic Qualification
The men's time trial and women's time trial were part of the qualification system for these cycling disciplines at the 2016 Summer Olympics.

Participating nations
791 national representatives from 76 national federations and 40 trade teams (including other riders) registered for the championships. The two riders from the Dominican Republic who would compete in the men's time trial did not start. Also riders from Syria and Uganda registered for the championships but did not start. The number of cyclists per nation that competed, excluding riders in the team time trials, is shown in parentheses.

Schedule

All events start and finish in Richmond, Virginia. All times are in Eastern Daylight Time (UTC−4).

Courses
The process for designing the courses began in the summer of 2011. Three main factors were considered when designing the courses: competitive and technical aspects; showcasing the best of the Richmond region; and the overall impact on local residents and businesses. An UCI official inspected the courses in December 2013. The courses were officially announced in February 2014. The course was used in competition during the national collegiate championships over May 2–4, 2014. All the races will finish in downtown Richmond on Broad Street, where the last few hundred meters are relatively flat. The lead-up in the final kilometers will be a bit uphill. Each lap of the 10-mile road circuit will contain a number of short, challenging climbs.

Team time trial

The team time trial starts in Henrico County at Lewis Ginter Botanical Garden, originally the Lakeside Wheel Club, founded in 1895 as a gathering spot for turn-of-the-century cyclists. The first kilometers go through Richmond's historic Northside neighborhoods leading into downtown. The course continues east of Richmond down rural Route 5, which parallels the 50-mile Virginia Capital Trail. The first few kilometers are scenic, flat, open roads that eventually narrow and wind through Richmond National Battlefield Park, a historic Civil War site. The race re-enters the city through Shockoe Bottom, eventually making a hard right turn on Governor Street to ascend . At the top, the teams have to take a sharp left turn onto the false-flat finishing straight,  to the finish.

Time trial (elite men)
It will go to Meadow Event Park, home to the State Fair of Virginia and birthplace of thoroughbred racing legend Secretariat. Racers will head south on long, open straights past the Hanover County Courthouse, the third oldest courthouse still in use in the U.S. and dating back to about 1740. Long hills on Brook and Wilkinson roads bring the racers back into the city through Virginia Union University before turning into downtown. Nearly half the turns of the entire route fall within the closing kilometers, the second to last of which is to ascend  on Governor Street. At the top, the teams have to take a sharp left turn onto the false-flat finishing straight,  to the finish.

Time trial (elite women, under-23 and juniors)

All individual time trials apart from the elite men time trial are on a circuit. Elite women, under-23 and junior men will ride two laps of the circuit and junior women will complete one lap.

The circuit is a technical course that winds through the city of Richmond. The start will head west from downtown to Monument Avenue, a paver-lined, historic boulevard that's been named one of the "10 Great Streets in America." From there, the course makes a 180-degree turn at N. Davis Avenue and continues in the opposite direction. The race then cuts through the Uptown district before coming back through Virginia Commonwealth University and then crossing the James River. After a technical turnaround, the race comes back across the James and works its way through downtown Richmond, eventually heading up to ascend  on Governor Street. At the top, the teams have to take a sharp left turn onto the false-flat finishing straight,  to the finish.

Road race circuit

All road races took place on a challenging, technical and inner-city road circuit. The circuit heads west from Downtown Richmond, working their way onto Monument Avenue, a paver-lined, historic boulevard that's been named one of the "10 Great Streets in America". Cyclists will take a 180-degree turn at the Jefferson Davis monument and then maneuver through the Uptown district and Virginia Commonwealth University. Halfway through the circuit, the race heads down into Shockoe Bottom before following the canal and passing Great Shiplock Park, the start of the Virginia Capital Trail. A sharp, off-camber turn at Rockets Landing brings the riders to the narrow, twisty, cobbled  climb up to Libby Hill Park in the historic Church Hill neighborhood. A quick descent, followed by three hard turns leads to a  climb up 23rd Street. Once atop this steep cobbled hill, riders descend into Shockoe Bottom. This leads them to the final  climb on Governor Street. At the top, the teams have to take a sharp left turn onto the false-flat finishing straight,  to the finish.

Events summary

Elite events

Under-23 events

Junior events

Medal table

Ranking by nations
For the ranking by nations the men's and women's team time trial are excluded.

References

External links

 
Entries, Start Lists and Results on the UCI website
Start Lists and Results  on the Tissot Timing website

 
UCI Road World Championships by year
World Championships
International cycle races hosted by the United States
Sports in Richmond, Virginia
2015 in American sports
2015 in sports in Virginia
Cycling competitions in the United States
September 2015 sports events in the United States